The Kh-31 (AS-17 'Krypton')  is a Russian air-to-surface missile carried by aircraft such as the MiG-29 or Su-27. It is capable of Mach 3.5 and was the first supersonic anti-ship missile that could be launched by tactical aircraft.

There are several variants; the Kh-31 is best known as an anti-radiation missile (ARM) but there are also anti-shipping and target drone versions. There has been talk of adapting it to make an "AWACS killer", a long-range air-to-air missile.

Development
The proliferation of surface-to-air missiles (SAMs) has made the Suppression of Enemy Air Defences (SEAD) a priority for any modern air force intending offensive action. Knocking out air search radars and fire control radars is an essential part of this mission. ARMs must have sufficient range that the launch platform is out of range of the SAMs, high speed to reduce the risk of being shot down and a seeker that can detect a range of radar types, but they do not need a particularly big warhead.

The Soviet Union's first ARM was developed by the Raduga OKB engineering group responsible for the Soviet Union's missiles for heavy bombers. The Kh-22P was developed from the 6-tonne Kh-22 (AS-4 "Kitchen") missile. Experience gained with this led in 1973 to the Kh-28 (AS-9 "Kyle") carried by tactical aircraft such as the Su-7B, Su-17 and Su-24. It had Mach 3 capability and a  range, greater than the contemporary AGM-78 Standard ARM. The Kh-28 was succeeded by the Kh-58 in 1978, which has similar speed and range but replaces the dual-fuel rocket motor with a much safer RDTT solid propellant.

The development of more sophisticated SAMs such as the MIM-104 Patriot and the US Navy's Aegis combat system put pressure on the Soviets to develop better ARMs in turn. Zvezda came at the problem from a different angle to Raduga, having a background in lightweight air-to-air missiles. However, in the mid-1970s they had developed the successful Kh-25 family of short-range air-to-surface missiles, including the Kh-25MP (AS-12 "Kegler") for anti-radar use. Zvezda started work on a long-range ARM and the first launch of the Kh-31 was in 1982. It entered service in 1988 and was first displayed in public in 1991, the Kh-31P at Dubai and the Kh-31A at Minsk.

In December 1997 it was reported that a small number of Kh-31s had been delivered to China, but that "production had yet to begin". It was around this time that the Russians sold Su-30MKK 'Flanker-G' aircraft to the Chinese. It seems that the original deliveries were of the original Russian model designated as X-31, to allow testing while the KR-1 model was being developed for licence production. Local production may have started by July 2005.

Russian development has accelerated since Zvezda was subsumed into the Tactical Missiles Corporation in 2002, with the announcement of the 'D' extended range models and the 'M' model mid-life updates (see Variants section below).

Design

In many respects the Kh-31 is a miniaturised version of the P-270 Moskit (SS-N-22 'Sunburn') and was reportedly designed by the same man. The missile is conventionally shaped, with cruciform wings and control surfaces made from titanium.  The two-stage propulsion is notable. On launch, a solid-fuel booster in the tail accelerates the missile to Mach 1.8 and the motor is discarded. Then four air intakes open up and as in the Franco-German ANS/ANF the empty rocket case becomes the combustion chamber of a kerosene-fuelled ramjet, which takes it beyond Mach 4.

The L-111E seeker of the anti-radar version has a unique antenna, an interferometer array of seven spiral antennas on a steerable platform.

Operational history
The Kh-31P ARM entered service in Russia in 1988 and the Kh-31A anti-shipping version in 1989. Unlike its predecessors, it can be fitted to almost any of Russia's tactical aircraft, from the Su-17 to MiG-31.

In 2001 India bought Kh-31s for its Su-30MKI; they appear to have bought 60 Kh-31A and 90 Kh-31P. A few Kh-31P/KR-1's were delivered to China in 1997 but these were apparently for testing and development work. The Chinese ordered Russian missiles in late 2002 or early 2003, leading to 200 KR-1's in their inventory by 2005; the Chinese press reported in July 2005 that Su-30MKK's of the 3rd Air Division had been equipped with the missiles.

The US Navy bought MA-31 target drones. An $18.468-million order for thirty-four MA-31 was placed in 1999, but this order was blocked by the Russians. The MA-31 was launched from an F-4 Phantom, and work was done on a kit to launch it from an F-16.

According to some reports, the missile was used by the Russian Air Force during the South Ossetian conflict in 2008. In particular, it was reported that on August 10, 2008 a Russian Air Force Su-34 struck a Georgian air defense radar near the city of Gori with Kh-31P anti-radar missiles. Georgian air defenses were disabled in order to avoid further losses.

The Kh-31 was used by Russia during the 2022 Russian invasion of Ukraine.

Variants

 Kh-31A - is a supersonic anti-ship missile with an active radar seeker to be used against vessels up to 4,500 tons. Missile is sea-skimming as it approaches the target. The missile uses a penetrating warhead.
 Kh-31P (Type 77P) - passive seeker head for use as an anti-radiation missile. The seeker has three interchangeable modules to cover different radar frequency bands, but they can only be changed at the factory.
 Kh-31PM - modernized version of the Kh-31P with increased range and new multi-band L-130 seeker sensor
As of 2012, the Kh-31PD is serially produced. Kh-31AD is in series production since 2013.
 Kh-31PK - installed non-contact fuse, maximum speed 900 m/s, range 120–160 km. Destined for Su-27SM, Su-30MK, Su-35. In serial production since 2009.
 MA-31 - telemetry and other systems installed by McDonnell Douglas/Boeing for use by the US Navy as a target drone. Tested between 1996 and 2007; a version upgraded with GPS, the MA-31PG, was offered to the Navy as a replacement for the MQM-8 Vandal but they bought the GQM-163 Coyote.
 KR-1 - version of the Kh-31P exported to China in 1997. It seems that Zvezda wanted to sell an initial batch of KR-1's to China, before the KR-1 went into production in China. Rather than the original three seeker modules, the KR-1 has a single K-112E "export" seeker targeting D-F band (S band) emissions, and reportedly optimised for specific Taiwanese radars.
 YJ-91 Ying Ji 91 - Chinese missile based on the Kh-31P. They are also reported to have developed an anti-shipping version with an indigenous active seeker, and are looking to develop this for use in submarines. The name YJ-91 was already in use by 1997, and may have been a Chinese name for the original Russian missiles designated X-31 by the Russians. By 2005, the name YJ-93 was being applied to missiles made in China, but Western reports generally do not distinguish between YJ-91 and YJ-93.

An active/passive air-to-air version for use against slow-moving support aircraft, a so-called "AWACS killer", was announced at the 1992 Moscow air show with  range. That would be less than the  promised by the Vympel R-37 (AA-13 'Arrow') and Novator R-172 missiles, but a Kh-31 derivative could be carried by a wider range of aircraft. However this may have been mere propaganda; in 2004 the Tactical Missiles Corporation "emphatically denied" that it had ever worked on an air-to-air version of the Kh-31. In 2005 rumours emerged of a Russian "AWACS-killer missile" based on the Kh-31A anti-shipping model, and of the Chinese adapting the YJ-91, derived from the Kh-31P, for the same purpose. In 2017, a representative of the Mikoyan company claimed that an air-to-air variant of the Kh-31 was in development, intended to equip the MiG-35, but this is not confirmed.

Operators

Current operators
  – 125 delivered in 2007-2009
 
 
  
  – Ordered Kh-31P missiles in 2019
  – 150
  – 222 delivered in 2009-2010
  – 87 delivered in 2008-2010
 
 
  - Kh-31P

Potential operators
  – In January 2021, the Bangladesh Air Force floated a tender for the procurement of Kh-31A missiles for MiG-29B aircraft.

Former operators
 United States (unknown number purchased from the Soviet Union)

See also
 DRDO Anti-Radiation Missile
 YJ-91 - Chinese missile based on Kh-31
 P-270 Moskit (SS-N-22 'Sunburn')
 AGM-88 HARM - main US ARM
 ALARM missile - British ARM with loiter capability
 MAR-1 - Brazilian ARM project
 AGM-136 Tacit Rainbow - US ARM cancelled in 1991

Notes

References

Sources
 

Kh-031
Kh-031
Cold War air-to-surface missiles of the Soviet Union
Kh-031
Kh-031
Tactical Missiles Corporation products
Anti-radiation missiles of the Cold War
Military equipment introduced in the 1980s